Reduce America's Debt Now Act of 2011 is a proposed act that will require employers to make non-deductible deductions from employees for the US Treasury to be used to feed the United States public debt. The bill was introduced on July 7, 2011, by Rick Crawford to the United States House of Representatives and referred to the United States House Committee on Ways and Means. The bill currently has 11 cosponsors.

References

Proposed legislation of the 112th United States Congress
Economy of the United States
National debt of the United States
United States proposed federal financial legislation